Joan Chandler (born Joan Cheeseman; August 24, 1923 – May 11, 1979) was an American actress who notably starred in Rope (1948) with James Stewart and Humoresque (1946) with Joan Crawford.

The daughter of Mr. and Mrs. Carl Cheeseman, Chandler was born in Butler, Pennsylvania. She took piano lessons from her musician mother and began studying ballet when she was 5. She attended Butler High School and the School of Arts at Bennington College. She also studied at the Neighborhood Playhouse School of the Theatre in New York. Before she became a professional actress, she toured with a ballet company.

A founding member of The Actors Studio, Chandler appeared in several feature films, five Broadway plays, and about 12 television programs, such as Studio One and Starlight Theatre. She was married twice: first to David McKay, with whom she had one daughter; then to Dr. Charles C. Hogan. Both marriages ended in divorce.

Chandler died at age 55 of cancer in New York City.

Filmography

 Humoresque (1946) - Gina Romney
 Rope (1948) - Janet Walker
 Dragstrip Riot (1958) - Lisa

Television

The Philco Television Playhouse (1 episode, 1949)
- "The House of the Seven Gables" (1949) TV episode
Actors Studio (1 episode, 1950)
- Sanctuary in Paris (1950) TV episode
Starlight Theatre (1 episode, 1950)
- The Roman Kid (1950) TV episode
Pulitzer Prize Playhouse (1 episode, 1951) - Hester
- The Silver Cord (1951) TV episode
Somerset Maugham TV Theatre (1 episode, 1951)
- The Romantic Young Lady (1951) TV episode
Armstrong Circle Theatre (1 episode, 1951)
- A Different World (1951) TV episode
Celanese Theatre (1 episode, 1951) - Miriamne
- "Winterset" (1951) TV episode
Suspense (1 episode, 1951)
- Mikki (1951) TV episode
Robert Montgomery Presents (1 episode, 1952)
- The Closed Door (1952) TV episode
Four Star Playhouse (1 episode, 1954)
- Detective's Holiday (1954) TV episode
Westinghouse Studio One (2 episodes, 1950–1956)
- Song for a Summer Night (1956) TV episode
- Spectre of Alexander Wolff (1950) TV episode

Plays

The Disenchanted (Breit-Schulberg)
Performer: Joan Chandler (Jere Halliday) - Replacement - Coronet Theatre - December 3, 1958 to May 16, 1959	
The Tempest (William  Shakespeare)
Starring: Joan Chandler (Miranda) - American Shakespeare Festival - August 1, 1955 to September 3, 1955
My Three Angels (Samuel and Bella Spewack)
Starring: Joan Chandler (Marie Louise Ducotel) - Morosco Theatre - March 11, 1953 to January 2, 1954
The Lady From the Sea (Ibsen)
Performer: Joan Chandler (Boletta) - Fulton Theatre - August 7, 1950 to August 19, 1950
Where's Charley? (Loesser-Abbott)
Starring: Joan Chandler (Amy Spettigue) - Replacement - musical based on Charley's Aunt - St. James Theatre - October 11, 1948 to September 9, 1950
The Late George Apley
Performer: Joan Chandler (Eleanor Apley) - based on the novel by J. P. Marquand - opened on Broadway at the Lyceum Theatre on November 23, 1944, and ran for 384 performances

References

External links

 
 
 Joan Chandler papers, 1923-1959, held by the Billy Rose Theatre Division, New York Public Library for the Performing Arts

1923 births
1979 deaths
Actresses from Pennsylvania
American film actresses
American stage actresses
American television actresses
People from Butler, Pennsylvania
20th-century American actresses
Deaths from cancer in New York (state)